Philip James Sales, Lord Sales, PC (born 11 February 1962) is a Justice of the Supreme Court of the United Kingdom. He took office on 14 January 2019.

Early life 
He was educated at the Royal Grammar School, Guildford, Churchill College, Cambridge (BA, 1983), and Worcester College, Oxford (BCL, 1984).

Career 
He was called to the bar at Lincoln's Inn in 1985. In 1997, he was appointed First Junior Treasury Counsel ("Treasury Devil"), a private practitioner barrister who represents the UK government in the civil courts. This caused "consternation" among senior lawyers, according to The Times due to his young age.

Sales was a practising barrister at 11 King's Bench Walk. At the time of the appointment, there was debate over Sales' appointment. According to The Guardian, an anonymous source referred to 11KBW as a "network of old boys and cronies", and that there was "no coincidence that the appointment came from Lord Irvine's and Tony Blair's old chambers". Acting as a barrister Sales defended the New Labour government's decision against holding a public inquiry into the Iraq War in the High Court in 2005.

He was made a QC in 2006, deputy judge of the High Court from 2004 to 2008, and judge of the High Court of Justice (Chancery Division) since 2008. He was a Lord Justice of the Court of Appeal from July 2014.

In 2016, Sales, as a member of the Court of Appeal ruled on 12 August 2016 that 130,000 Labour members who joined the party after 12 January 2016 would not be able to vote in the leadership contest, which over-ruled the previous High Court decision to allow the 130,000 disenfranchised Labour Party members to vote in the 2016 Labour Party leadership election.

In October 2016 Sales was one of the three judges forming the divisional court of the High Court in proceedings concerning the use of the royal prerogative for the issue of notification in accordance with Article 50 of the Treaty on European Union, R (Miller) v Secretary of State for Exiting the European Union. His role in this judgment meant that he appeared in an infamous front-cover of the Daily Mail (Enemies of the People).

Supreme Court 
Lord Justice Sales was appointed as a Justice of the Supreme Court of the United Kingdom on 11 January 2019, taking the judicial courtesy title of Lord Sales.

Personal life 
Sales married Miranda Wolpert in 1988; they have a son and a daughter.

Arms

References

1962 births
Living people
People educated at Royal Grammar School, Guildford
Alumni of Churchill College, Cambridge
Alumni of Worcester College, Oxford
Members of Lincoln's Inn
Chancery Division judges
Judges of the Supreme Court of the United Kingdom
Members of the Privy Council of the United Kingdom
Knights Bachelor